The 2002 Super Fours was the inaugural cricket Super Fours tournament. It took place in May and June and saw 4 teams compete in a 50 over league. The tournament was conceived as a way of bridging the gap between women's county cricket and international cricket, and preparing players for the upcoming England internationals. Braves were the first winners of the competition, winning four out of six games.

Competition format
Teams played each other twice in a round-robin format, with the winners of the group winning the tournament. Matches were played using a one day format with 50 overs per side.

The group worked on a points system with positions within the divisions being based on the total points. 12 points were awarded for a win.

Teams

Results

Source: Cricket Archive

References

Super Fours